On October 24, 2004, a Beechcraft Super King Air aircraft, registered  and owned by NASCAR team Hendrick Motorsports, crashed into mountainous terrain in Stuart, Virginia, during a missed approach to Blue Ridge Airport in Martinsville, Virginia. The aircraft was transporting eight passengers and two flight crew to Martinsville so they could attend the NASCAR event at Martinsville Speedway that afternoon.

All ten people on board were killed; among them, members of the Hendrick family including John Hendrick, president of Hendrick Motorsports, his twin daughters, and Ricky Hendrick, former Busch Series driver and heir to the Hendrick empire.  Hendrick Motorsports staff involved includes Kimberly and Jennifer Hendrick, General Manager Jeff Turner, and chief engine builder Randy Dorton. The pilots were Richard Tracy and Elizabeth Morrison. Other passengers include Joe Jackson, an executive at DuPont and Scott Lathram, Tony Stewart's pilot.

Crash 

The King Air took off from Concord, North Carolina, at 12 pm EST, carrying eight passengers and two flight crew. Among them were several key Hendrick Motorsports staff, including team president John Hendrick and his twin daughters, Kimberly and Jennifer Hendrick; Ricky Hendrick, son of Rick Hendrick; general manager Jeff Turner; and chief engine builder Randy Dorton. The other people on board were Joe Jackson, a DuPont executive; Scott Lathram, a pilot for driver Tony Stewart; and pilots Richard Tracy and Elizabeth Morrison, who was scheduled to come to her brother's (Rick Morrison) birthday party that night after the race. The plane was reported missing at 3:00 pm. Eventually 9-1-1 was called, and fire trucks and police cars patrolled the Virginia area during the race itself. Around midway through the race, a Civil Air Patrol search team patrolling the nearby Bull Mountain's peak found airplane wreckage on the summit. When removing the wreckage from the summit, response teams found the bodies of the Hendrick group at 11:05 pm. Everyone on board had been killed. A search by firefighters also discovered a scar on the mountain of moved dirt; the discovery proved that the airplane crashed on the side of the mountain and the explosion blew the wreckage and group upward.

NASCAR received word of the plane crash halfway through the race at Martinsville. Jimmie Johnson, a Hendrick driver, won the race. Due to the circumstances, the usual victory lane celebration did not take place. Upon the conclusion of the race, NASCAR called all Hendrick personnel to its mobile operations trailer where details of the accident were disclosed to the team.

Investigation 
An investigation conducted by the National Transportation Safety Board (NTSB) followed soon after the crash.

Weather
There were foggy conditions at the time of the plane crash.

Pilot error as a cause
The NTSB suggested that pilot error was the cause of the crash, partly by:
 the plane missing its first landing attempt before veering off course and crashing;

The NTSB concluded its investigation by suggesting that the pilots failed to execute an instrument approach procedure and that both failed to use all navigational aids to confirm the airplane's position during its approach.

Aftermath

Impact on Hendrick Motorsports

On February 18, 2005, Marshall Carlson, Rick Hendrick's son-in-law, signed on as new general manager.

Memorials
The week following the crash, officials at the Atlanta Motor Speedway held a moment of silence before both the Busch and Nextel Cup races and lowered the flags to half staff. All the Hendrick Motorsports cars, as well as the No. 0 driven by Ward Burton of Hendrick-affiliated Haas CNC Racing, carried tributes on the hoods for those who were lost the week before. Jimmie Johnson (who won the Bass Pro Shops MBNA 500 race) and the rest of his teammates and crew wore their caps backwards in victory lane as a tribute to Ricky Hendrick, who had a habit of doing the same. Teams who win in Hendrick Motorsports cars continue the tradition to honor Ricky after every race win. At the Hendrick museum in Concord, North Carolina, 300 people showed up for a candlelight vigil in honor of the ten victims.

The Randy Dorton Trophy now goes to the winner of the Mahle Engine Builders Challenge.

See also 
 List of accidents involving sports teams

References

External links
 Jayski's NASCAR Silly Season Site page

2004 in NASCAR
2004 in Virginia
Airliner accidents and incidents involving controlled flight into terrain
Airliner accidents and incidents caused by pilot error
Aviation accidents and incidents in the United States in 2004
Aviation accidents and incidents in Virginia
Accidents and incidents involving the Beechcraft Super King Air
Aviation accidents and incidents involving professional sports teams
Disasters in Virginia
History of NASCAR
Martinsville, Virginia
Patrick County, Virginia
October 2004 events in the United States